Pauini River may refer to:

 Pauini River (Purus River), a river of Brazil
 Pauini River (Unini River), a river of Brazil